Elizabeth Berridge (3 December 1919 – 2 December 2009) was a British novelist and critic, most famous for the novels Across the Common, which won the 1964 Yorkshire Post Novel of the Year Award, and Touch and Go.

Publications
The Story of Stanley Brent (1945). Novella
House of Defence (1945). Novel
Selected Stories (1947); reissued by Persephone Books as Tell It to a Stranger (2000).
Be Clean, Be Tidy (1949); in U.S. titled It Won't Be Flowers. Novel
Upon Several Occasions (1953). Novel
Rose under Glass (1961). Novel
Across the Common (1964); in U.S. Lancer paperback edition titled The Violent Past (1968). Novel
Sing Me Who You Are (1967). Novel
That Surprising Summer (1972). For children
The Barretts of Hope End: The Early Diary of Elizabeth Barrett Browning (editor) (1974).
Family Matters: Sixteen Stories (1980).
Run for Home (1981). For children
People at Play (1982). Novel
Touch and Go (1995). Novel

References

1919 births
2009 deaths
English women novelists
English short story writers
Writers from London
British women short story writers
20th-century English novelists
20th-century English women writers
20th-century British short story writers